Hexachaeta guatemalensis is a species of tephritid or fruit flies in the genus Hexachaeta of the family Tephritidae.

References

guatemalensis
Insects of Central America